Between 1945 and 2007 Nepalese banknotes were issued with the portraits of four different kings. Starting in October 2007 the king’s portrait was replaced by Mount Everest on all notes which have been issued since.

1945 - 1955

The early banknotes which were issued between 1945 and 1955 during the rule of King Tribhuvan were not put into circulation by a Central Bank which did not exist in Nepal at that time. The issuing authority was the treasury which had the name Sadar Muluki Khana. Therefore, the notes of king Tribhuvan were not signed by a bank governor, but by a Kajanchi (head of the treasury) who was a high Hindu priest in the same time. Nepal’s early paper currency probably includes the only notes of the world which were signed by a high priest. These early notes were printed by the Indian Security Press in Nashik and do not have any security features, except for the water marks and the special paper on which they are printed.

1955 - 1972
 
Starting with King Mahendra who succeeded to his father Tribhuvan in 1955, the banknotes were issued by Nepal Rastra Bank (Nepal National Bank) which was founded in April 1956. The signature of the governors of this institution is found on the banknotes which were issued after this date.
Under king Mahendra the Nepalese Government became “His Majesty’s Government” (expressed by "shri 5 ko sarakar" which literally means “the government of the five times honoured”) and remained this way during the rule of Birendra and Gyanendra.
Two series of banknotes were issued during the rule of king Mahendra: The first series shows the king in civilian clothes wearing the Nepalese “topi” while on the notes of the second series the king is shown in military uniform. The second series comprised for the first time notes of the high value of 500 and 1000 rupees.

1972 - 2001

During King Birendra’s rule one can also distinguish between two major series of banknotes. The first series features the king wearing military uniform while on the notes of the second series the king is wearing the traditional Nepalese crown adorned with feathers of the bird of paradise. During this period regular banknotes of 2 and 20 rupees and special banknotes of 25 and 250 rupees were issued for the first time.

2001 - 2007

The banknotes issued during this period have the same basic design as those of King Birendra whose portrait was simply replaced by that of his younger brother and successor Gyanendra. The low values of 1 and 2 rupees, and the special values of 25 and 250 rupees were not issued any more. 

The legends found on the last issues of Gyanendra revert to Nepal sarkar (“Nepalese Government”), thus omitting the reference to the king.

2007/2008

In October 2007, a 500 rupee note was issued on which the king’s portrait was replaced by and image of Mount. Everest. This reflects the historical change from kingdom to republic which took place in May 2008 in Nepal. Further notes of 5, 10, 20, 50, 100 and 1,000 rupees with Mount Everest and without references to the king in their legends followed in 2008. The first issues of the 500 and 1000 rupees notes were printed on paper which still had the king's crowned portrait as a watermark in the "window" on the right part of the face of the notes. It was decided to print a red Rhododendron flower (Nepal's national flower) on top of the watermark. Notes of these denominations which were issued in 2009 and thereafter are printed on paper which has a rhododendron flower as watermark instead of the royal portrait and were therefore released without the additional overprint in red.

2012-2019
In 2012, Nepal Rastra Bank issued a revised banknote series that are similar to the 2007 series, but now include inscriptions in English and the date of issue on the back.

Currency unit
The currency unit of the Tribhuvan and early Mahendra notes was the mohar (spelt moru on the banknotes), which originally was a silver coin which weighed about 5.4 grams and represented about half an Indian Rupee. The later notes of Mahendra and the issues of the subsequent rulers Birendra and Gyanendra were issued with the denomination rupee (spelt rupaya[n] on the notes).

Printers
The banknotes with the portrait of The King Tribhuvan were printed in Nashik (India). The later issues were supplied by firms such as De La Rue and Giesecke & Devrient.

References
Agrawal (Giriya), Shyam and Gyawali, Kamal Prasad: Notes and Coins of Nepal. Nepal Rastra Bank Golden Jubilee Year 2005/06, Kathmandu, 2006.
Bertsch, Wolfgang: "The Legends on the Banknotes of Nepal", International Banknote Society (IBNS) Journal, vol. 48, no. 3, 2009, p. 39-44.
Jha, Hari Jaya: An Overview of Nepalese Paper Money. Manjeeta Jha, Lalitpur (Patan), B.S. 2058 (= A.D. 2001).
Khatiwada, Shyam: Glimpses of Nepalese Paper Currency. Published by Mrs. Bhagawati Khatiwada, Kathmandu, 2012. .
Lorenzoli, Giovanni: “Nepali artistic buildings as seen on Nepali notes”. Journal of the International Banknote Society, vol. 43, no. 3 (2004), p. 6-14.
Shrestha, Ramesh: Nepalese Coins & Bank Notes (1911 to 1955). Kazi Mudhusudan Raj Bhandary, Kathmandu, 2007.
Wittmann, Hans: Die Banknoten des Königreichs Nepal. Unpublished, Wiesbaden, 2002.

External links
 https://web.archive.org/web/20120226020850/http://red.nrb.org.np/publications/golden_jubilee/Golden_Jubilee_Publications--Notes_and_Coins_of_Nepal.pdf
 http://www.nuphil.com/BankNotesofNepal.html

See also

Nepalese rupee
Mohar

Currencies of Nepal
Nepal